Dercas lycorias, the "plain sulphur", is a small butterfly of the family Pieridae (colloquially the "yellows and whites"), which is found in India.

See also
List of butterflies of India (Pieridae)

References
 
  
 
 
 

Butterflies of Asia
Coliadinae
Butterflies described in 1842
Taxa named by Henry Doubleday